The Nehammer government was sworn in as the 35th and current Government of Austria on 6 December 2021. It is headed by Chancellor Karl Nehammer.

Composition 
The cabinet consists of:

See also 
Politics of Austria

Notes

References

2021 establishments in Austria
Cabinets established in 2021
Politics of Austria
Schallenberg
2020s in Austria
Current governments